Joe Herman "Red" Hayes (1926-1973) was a fiddle player and singer-songwriter who co-wrote "A Satisfied Mind" with Jack Rhodes. He was born April 4, 1926 in Garden Valley, Texas. During a UK tour with Faron Young, Hayes died of a heart attack on March 2, 1973 while performing in Manchester, England.

References 

West Texas Music Hall of Fame
findagrave.com Joseph Herman "Red" Hayes

1926 births
1973 deaths
People from Smith County, Texas
American singer-songwriters
American male singer-songwriters
American fiddlers
20th-century American violinists
20th-century American singers
20th-century American male singers